Murat Paluli (born 9 August 1994) is a Turkish professional footballer who plays as a right back for Sivasspor.

Professional career
On 6 June 2019, Paluli signed his first professional contract with Göztepe. Paluli made his professional debut in a 1-0 Süper Lig win over Trabzonspor on 2 November 2019.

On 6 June 2022, Paluli signed a two-year contract with Sivasspor.

References

External links

TFF Profile

1994 births
Sportspeople from Erzurum
Living people
Turkish footballers
Association football fullbacks
Büyükşehir Belediye Erzurumspor footballers
Hatayspor footballers
Göztepe S.K. footballers
Sivasspor footballers
Süper Lig players
TFF First League players
TFF Second League players
TFF Third League players